Streptomyces echinoruber is a bacterium species from the genus of Streptomyces which was isolated from soil in Argentina. Streptomyces echinoruber produces the red pigment rubrolone.

See also 
 List of Streptomyces species

References

Further reading

External links
Type strain of Streptomyces echinoruber at BacDive -  the Bacterial Diversity Metadatabase

echinoruber
Bacteria described in 1981